Ingrid Jespersens Gymnasieskole is a private school located on Nordre Frihavnsgade in the Østerbro district of Copenhagen, Denmark.

History
 
The school was established as a private primary school for girls by Ingrid Jespersen under the name Ingrid Jespersens Pigeskole in 1894. It was originally based in rented rooms in Gustav Adolph Hagemann's former house on Nordre Frihavnsvej (formerly Kalkbrænderivej, now Nordre Frihavnegade). The house was replaced by a new three-storey building at the same site in 1897. It was designed in the National Romantic style by A. M. Andersen.

In 1905, it was expanded to also include a gymnasium (High school). Ingrid Jespersen introduced sloyd  laboratories for physics and chemistry classes in 1908, which was unusual for a girls' school at the time. The school was converted into a privately-owned institution in 1912 and was expanded by the architect Kristoffer Varming.

In 1932, the school took over the neighbouring building at No. 9, the former Østerbro Police Station. The school was opened to male students in 1960.

As of today, the school remains one of Copenhagen's most popular private schools.

Famous graduates 
 195?: Jane Aamund, author
 1959: Tine Bryld, social worker, writer, radio personality
 1975: Tøger Seidenfaden, journalist, editor-in-chief
 1976: Lone Scherfig, film director
 1982: Merete Ahnfeldt-Mollerup, architect
 1985: Adam Price, screenwriter, television chef
 1991: Mads Brügger, journalist

References

External links

 Official website
 Official Alumni website

Gymnasiums in Copenhagen
Primary schools in Copenhagen
Independent schools in Copenhagen
Private schools in Copenhagen
Girls' schools in Copenhagen
Educational institutions established in 1894
1894 establishments in Denmark
Buildings and structures in Østerbro
Sloyd